The Sonex, Waiex and Xenos are a family of  lightweight, metal, low-wing, two seat homebuilt aircraft. Kits are produced and marketed by Sonex Aircraft, a small manufacturer based in Oshkosh, Wisconsin. By 2014, 500 customer built aircraft had been completed.
The Sonex can also be built from plans.

Company founder John Monnett was approached by an Italian business looking for an aircraft that would meet their Microlight category. A variation of Sonerai was initially proposed to meet the 40 mph minimum flight speed requirement. Eventually a clean-sheet design was built around a Jabiru or VW engine installation with similar all-aluminum box fuselage construction as the Monnett Moni.

The Sonex, Waiex and Xenos all qualify as American experimental light-sport aircraft (ELSA).

Development
The Sonex plans contain several construction options, including conventional or tricycle landing gear, as well as a center or dual stick. Motor mount drawings are supplied for all three recommended powerplants: the 2180cc Volkswagen, 2200 Jabiru, and 3300 Jabiru. High performance is achieved through a clean aerodynamic shape and simple, light weight construction.

The Sonex can be built from scratch using factory supplied drawings or may be assembled in approximately 800 to 1,000 hours using the precut complete airframe kit. A complete kit based Sonex can be constructed for as little as USD$25,600.

The aviation website Aero-News.Net named the Sonex the Plane Of The Year - E-LSA Kit Category for 2006.

Variants
Sonex
The original model, incorporating a low-wing design, seats two, and a conventional tail. Available as plans or a kit.
Sonex B
Introduced in April 2016, this model is a modification of the original Sonex, with an enlarged cockpit for larger and taller pilots, a center "Y-stick", electric flaps and dual throttles as standard. Support for the CAMit 3300 was offered and more room for the Rotax 912 and ULPower UL350i series of engines.
Waiex
In production - Almost identical to the Sonex, but features a Y-tail. Although similar in looks to a V-tail, the Y-tail has a stub rudder in line with the aft fuselage. The company markets this version under the motto Just Because It Looks Cool. Available as a kit only.
Waiex B
Introduced April 2016 - Same improvements as Sonex B
e-Flight Waiex
Waiex electric aircraft variant, powered by a DC brushless electric motor, built in 2007 and first displayed at AirVenture in 2009. Available as a kit only.
Xenos
In production - motor-glider development of the Waiex with longer wings and the same choice of engines. Available as a kit only.
Onex
(pronounced One-ex by the company) In production - All new design introduced at Airventure 2009. The design features a single seat with folding wings and an AeroVee Volkswagen air-cooled engine.
Teros
(2015) A proposed UAV, developed with Navmar Applied Sciences Corporation using the Waiex airframe powered by a turbocharged Aero-Vee engine.
SubSonex
 A single place single engine turbine aircraft similar in design to an Onex, with a Waiex style Y tail. Introduced at Airventure 2009. Powered by a Czech-built PBS TJ-100 turbojet engine mounted above the aft fuselage, with the exhaust exiting between the Y-tail. The SubSonex achieved first engine test runs in December 2009. The engine produces   of thrust. Originally developed with only a central mono pod wheel, tail wheel and small wing tip outriggers. The prototype developed directional controllability problems during taxi-tests. The SubSonex now has a tricycle landing gear. and was flight tested by Jet-sailplane performer Bob Carlton in August 2011.

Specifications (Sonex)

References

External links

KitPlanes Flight Review: Waiex B
AVweb guide to the Sonex and Waiex

2000s United States sport aircraft
Homebuilt aircraft
Light-sport aircraft
Monnett aircraft
V-tail aircraft
Single-engined tractor aircraft
Sonex
Low-wing aircraft